Gautieria morchelliformis is a species of hypogeal fungus in the family Gomphaceae. It was first described scientifically by Italian Carlo Vittadini in 1831. Three varieties have been described: var. globispora and var. stenospora by Albert Pilát in 1958; and var. microspora by Evžen Wichanský in 1962. None are considered to have independent taxonomical significance.

References

Fungi described in 1831
Fungi of Europe
Fungi of North America
Gomphaceae